The Embassy of Latvia (historically known as the Alice Pike Barney Studio House or Studio House) in Washington, D.C., is the diplomatic mission of the Republic of Latvia to the United States. It is located at 2306 Massachusetts Avenue NW on Embassy Row in the Sheridan-Kalorama neighborhood.

The current ambassador is Māris Selga.

Building history

Alice Pike Barney Studio House
Designed by Waddy Butler Wood in 1902, the former studio house of Alice Pike Barney is an example of Spanish Colonial Revival architecture. It was used by Barney until her death and her daughters Natalie Barney and Laura Dreyfus-Barney held the house until 1961.

Smithsonian Institution
In 1961 the Barney women donated the house to the Smithsonian Institution. In 1976 it was opened as part of the National Museum of American Art to be used as a house museum. After more than 14 years the building had succumbed to significant structural damage. Since it would cost more than $2 million to renovate the house, the building was closed and the building and its furnishings were put up for sale.

The Friends of Alice Pike Barney Studio House was incorporated in 1993 to buy the house and pay for its renovations. Alice Pike Barney: Her Life and Art, written by curator of the house, Jean L. Kling was the subject of a book party to raise funds in 1994. The same year, the association attempted a working relationship with the Smithsonian Institution to preserve the building. Unable to raise sufficient funds, the house was listed for sale by the Smithsonian Institution in 1999 and the following years attempts to have the building zones for use as a School of Arts. Its ownership was passed  to the Latvian government in 2001, with the intention of hosting events in memory of Alice Pike Barney and her art.

Embassy of Latvia
The renovated house is used as a residence for the Latvian ambassador and an embassy.

National Register of Historic Places

In addition to being listed on the National Register of Historic Places, the building is a contributing property to the 'Sheridan-Kalorama Historic District' and Massachusetts Avenue Historic District.

References

External links

 
 Friends of Alice Pike Barney Studio House, Inc. Collection at the National Museum of Women in the Arts

Latvia
Washington, D.C.
Latvia
Houses completed in 1902
Sheridan-Kalorama Historic District
Houses on the National Register of Historic Places in Washington, D.C.
Latvia–United States relations
Arts and Crafts architecture in the United States
Spanish Colonial Revival architecture in the United States
Individually listed contributing properties to historic districts on the National Register in Washington, D.C.